Nitnem (Punjabi: ਨਿਤਨੇਮ) (literally Daily Routine) is a collection of Sikh  hymns (Gurbani) to be read minimally 3 different times of the day. These are mandatory and to be read by every Amritdhari Sikh as expressed in the Sikh Rehat Maryada. Optionally additional prayers may be added to a Sikh's nitnem. There are five hymns (Five Banis) to be done during Amrit Vela (early morning), the Rehras Sahib hymn for the evening and Kirtan Sohila for the night. The morning and evening prayers should be followed by an Ardaas.

Morning Prayers
 Japji Sahib
 Jaap Sahib
 Tav-Prasad Savaiye
 Chaupai Sahib
 Anand Sahib

As per the Sikh Code of Conduct, Sikhs are only required to recite Japji Sahib, Jaap Sahib, & the Ten Sawayyas in the morning. Many Sikhs, including those who follow the lifestyle of the Damdami Taksal & AKJ, believe that Chaupai Sahib & Anand Sahib are also required in the morning prayers. Sometimes this is referred to as the Five Banis. These prayers are recited between 2 - 6 AM. These morning prayers are required to be followed by the Ardas.

Evening Prayer

 Rehras Sahib 
 Ardas 
This prayer is recited after sunset and takes about 8–12 minutes to recite. This evening prayer is required to be followed by the Ardas.

Night Prayer

 Kirtan Sohila Sahib
Some Sikh schools of thought also recite Rakhiya De Shabad before Kirtan Sohila. This prayer is recited before going to bed and takes about 5–12 minutes to recite. This night prayer is not required to be followed by the Ardas.

Other Prayers Commonly Read

Sukhmani Sahib 
Arati
Sidh Gosti 
Uggardanti

See also
 Dasam Granth Sahib
 Guru Granth Sahib
 Sukhmani Sahib
 Amrit Vela
 Meditation
 Simran

References

External links 
 All Nitnem Path (Nitnem Prayers) in Punjabi, Hindi, English

Dasam Granth
Sikh prayer
Reading of religious texts